H. J. High Construction is a construction company headquartered in Orlando, Florida and licensed in Florida, Georgia and South Carolina.

History
The company was founded in 1936 in Orlando, Florida by Harlem John High, a New York City brick mason who relocated to Orlando in 1935. Harlem John High ran the company until his death in 1968. He was succeeded by his son Steven, who served as the company's president from 1968 to 2005. Steven W. High received a Bachelor of Science degree from Stetson University, an MBA from Rollins College, and completed Harvard University’s Owner/President Management School program. He is DBIA-certified and a Certified General Contractor.

In 2006, Steven High became the company's Chairman, with his son Robert John High assuming the President's position. Robert J. High earned a Bachelor of Arts degree from Furman University, an MBA from Rollins College, and completed Harvard University's Owner/President Management School program. He is LEED accredited, DBIA-certified, and a Certified General Contractor.

In 1961, H. J. High received an Award of Merit from the U.S. Army Corps of Engineers for its work in helping Cape Kennedy prepare for the Apollo moon landing program.

Operations

H. J. High Construction provides general contracting, pre-construction services, design-build, construction management, and preventative maintenance services for education, religious, industrial, and commercial facilities.

Industries segments include:

Commercial
Construction Management
Distribution
Education
Food & Beverage
Green Building
Manufacturing
Public-Private Partnerships

H. J. High clients include Walt Disney World, Lockheed Martin, Mitsubishi Power Systems America,  Orange County (FL) Convention Center, First Baptist Church of Orlando, Indian River State College, and National Distribution Centers. The company has completed nearly 1,000 projects ranging from $100,000 to $100 million and has never been involved in litigation.

Community involvement

H. J. High donates volunteer time to community organizations and local nonprofits. Current and past recipients include:

 Camp Boggy Creek
 Center for Independent Living
 Coalition for the Homeless of Central Florida
 Florida United Methodist Children's Home
 Grace Medical Home
 Habitat for Humanity
 Hailey's Hopes & Hugs Foundation
 Pet Rescue by Judy
 Quest, Inc./Camp Thunderbird
 Susan G. Komen Race for the Cure
 The Nature Conservancy's Oyster Reef Restoration Program
 The Russell Home for Atypical Children in South Orlando
 The Sunshine Foundation

References

External links 

Companies based in Orlando, Florida
Construction and civil engineering companies established in 1936
Construction and civil engineering companies of the United States
1936 establishments in Florida